Rusticus is a Latin adjective meaning "rural, simple, rough or clownish" and can refer to:

Animals
 Aedes rusticus, a European mosquito
 Rusty crayfish (Orconectes rusticus)
 Urozelotes rusticus, a ground spider
 a synonym of the butterfly genus Plebejus

People

Saints and martyrs
Saint Rusticus of Narbonne (died c. 461)
Saint Rusticus (Archbishop of Lyon) (c. 455–501)
 One of the martyred companions of Saint Denis (3rd century)
 Martyr of Verona (died c. 290): see Firmus and Rusticus

Other people
Fabius Rusticus, 1st-century historian of ancient Rome
Arulenus Rusticus, (c. 35–93 AD) consul executed by Domitian
Flavius Rusticus Helpidius, 5th-century Latin poet
Junius Rusticus, 2nd-century Stoic philosopher, consul, and friend of Marcus Aurelius